The discography of The Bronx, a Los Angeles-based punk rock band, consists of six eponymously titled studio albums, two EPs, one DVD, eleven singles, two demos, and eleven music videos. This includes releases by the band's mariachi alter-ego Mariachi El Bronx.

The Bronx formed in 2002 with an initial lineup of singer Matt Caughthran, guitarist Joby J. Ford, bassist James Tweedy, and drummer Jorma Vik. After only twelve live performances the band signed to major label Island Def Jam, but opted to put out their early releases independently. They released two demos, both titled Sure Death, in 2002 on their own label, White Drugs. Their first single, "Bats!", was released in July 2003 on Tarantulas Records. Their debut album The Bronx was released in August 2003 through White Drugs and Ferret Records. Later that year Wichita Recordings released La Muerte Viva, an EP exclusive to the United Kingdom and Australia. Wichita has also released all of the singles from The Bronx's albums, beginning with "They Will Kill Us All (Without Mercy)" and "False Alarm" in 2004, which were made into music videos and reached #65 and #73 on the UK Singles Chart, respectively.

In January 2006 The Bronx released the first two installments of their Social Club series, an exclusive series of singles limited to 250 copies each. The DVD Live at the Annandale followed later that month, documenting a 2004 performance in Sydney. Their only album for Island Def Jam, The Bronx, was released in July 2006 and supported by singles and music videos for "Shitty Future", "History's Stranglers", and "White Guilt". Ken Horne of The Dragons played some guitar parts on the album and soon joined the band as second guitarist. The band also appeared on the soundtrack to the film Snakes on a Plane with a remix of "Around the Horn".

In 2008 The Bronx left Island Def Jam and Brad Magers replaced James Tweedy on bass. That March they recorded two albums, one in a punk rock style and one in a mariachi style. A third Social Club single was released that May, followed by the punk rock album in November. Another eponymous effort, it was released independently on White Drugs and was their first album to reach the Billboard charts, reaching #17 on Top Heatseekers. "Young Bloods" was released as a single, with music videos also filmed for "Knifeman", "Past Lives", and "Inveigh". Mariachi El Bronx followed in September 2009 through Swami Records, who had released the vinyl edition of their 2006 album. "Cell Mates" has been released as a single and music video from the mariachi album, and a video has also been released for "Holy". A second Mariachi El Bronx album followed in August 2011. An EP of cover versions, titled Plys Yr Fvrt Sngs, was released in conjunction with the album.

In a 2009 interview, Caughthran explained the reasoning behind titling all of The Bronx's albums eponymously, citing the desire to place focus on Ford's album artwork: "Joby's a great artist as far as graphic design goes, so the idea behind that is to have the records distinguished by their art instead of some amazing sentence or theme or word."

Studio albums

Extended plays

Singles
With the exception of "Bats!", all of The Bronx's singles have only been released in the United Kingdom, through Wichita Recordings. They have been released as CDs and as vinyl 7-inches, with the 7-inches limited to 1,500 copies each.

Social Club singles 
Each Social Club single is limited to 250 copies on clear vinyl with hand-screened artwork.

Video albums

Demos 
A "couple hundred" of each demo were sold at The Bronx's early shows, in white cardboard sleeves with the "Sure Death" logo in red, black, or blue.

Music videos

Other appearances 
The following songs by The Bronx were released on compilation albums, soundtracks, and other releases. This is not an exhaustive list; songs that were first released on the band's albums, EPs, or singles are not included.

References

External links 

 

Discography
Discographies of American artists
Punk rock group discographies